Bunt v Hallinan [1985] 1 NZLR 450 is a cited case in New Zealand land law.

References

Property law of New Zealand